Nashoba is an unincorporated community in Pushmataha County, Oklahoma, United States, 11 miles southeast of Tuskahoma.

A United States Post Office opened at Nashoba, Indian Territory on September 13, 1886. The community took its name from Nashoba County, Choctaw Nation. The county took its name from nashoba, the word in the Choctaw language for “wolf”, and the county was often referred to as Wolf County.

Portions of the Nashoba area were formerly in Nashoba County, Choctaw Nation. Nashoba County was disestablished upon Oklahoma statehood on November 16, 1907 and incorporated into McCurtain County and Pushmataha County.

Transportation in the Nashoba area was revolutionized during the 1950s with the construction of U.S. Highway 271, an all-weather paved highway connecting it to Clayton on the north and Antlers on the south. Oklahoma State Highway 144 connects Nashoba with Honobia and the mountain communities to its east.

More information on Nashoba and the Little River valley may be found in the Pushmataha County Historical Society.

Demographics

Utilities
Telephone and Internet is provided by Hilliary Communications.

References

External links
Nashoba visitors' guide

Unincorporated communities in Pushmataha County, Oklahoma
Unincorporated communities in Oklahoma